Luton Town Football Club is a professional association football club based in the town of Luton, Bedfordshire, England, that competes in the Championship, the second tier of the English football league system. Founded in 1885, it is nicknamed 'the Hatters' and affiliated to the Bedfordshire County Football Association. The team plays its home matches at Kenilworth Road, where it has been based since 1905. The club's history includes one major trophy win, several financial crises, numerous promotions and relegations, and some spells of sustained success. It was perhaps most prominent between 1982 and 1992, when it was a member of English football's top division, at that time the First Division; the team won its first major honour, the Football League Cup, in 1988. Luton Town have a long-standing rivalry with nearby club Watford.

The club was the first in southern England to turn professional, making payments to players as early as 1890 and turning fully professional a year later. It joined the Football League before the 1897–98 season, left in 1900 because of financial problems, and rejoined in 1920. Luton reached the First Division in 1955–56 and contested a major final for the first time when playing Nottingham Forest in the 1959 FA Cup Final. The team was then relegated from the top division in 1959–60, and demoted twice more in the following five years, playing in the Fourth Division from the 1965–66 season. However, it was promoted back to the top level by 1974–75.

Luton Town's most recent successful period began in 1981–82, when the club won the Second Division, and thereby gained promotion to the First. Luton defeated Arsenal 3–2 in the 1988 Football League Cup Final and remained in the First Division until relegation at the end of the 1991–92 season. Between 2007 and 2009, financial difficulties caused the club to fall from the second tier of English football to the fifth in successive seasons. The last of these relegations came during the 2008–09 season, when 30 points were docked from Luton's record for various financial irregularities. Luton thereafter spent five seasons in non-League football before winning the Conference Premier in 2013–14, securing promotion back into the Football League. More success soon followed, with Luton being promoted from League Two and League One in successive seasons in 2017–18 and 2018–19, meaning Luton now play in the Championship.

History

Formation and election to the Southern League (1885–1890)
Luton Town Football Club was formed on 11 April 1885. Before this there were many clubs in the town, the most prominent of which were Luton Wanderers and Luton Excelsior. A Wanderers player, George Deacon, came up with the idea of a 'Town' club which would include all the best players in Luton. Wanderers secretary Herbert Spratley seized upon Deacon's idea and arranged a secret meeting on 13 January 1885 at the St Matthews school rooms in High Town. The Wanderers committee resolved to rename the club Luton Town—which was not well received by the wider community. The local newspapers referred to the club as 'Luton Town (late Wanderers)'. When George Deacon and John Charles Lomax then arranged a public meeting with the purpose of forming a 'Luton Town Football Club', Spratley protested, saying there was already a Luton Town club; and the atmosphere was tense when the meeting convened in the town hall on 11 April 1885. The meeting, attended by most football lovers in the town, heard about Spratley's secret January meeting and voted down his objections. The motion to form a 'Luton Town Football Club', put forward by G H Small and seconded by E H Lomax, was carried. A club committee was elected by ballot and the team colours were agreed to be pink and dark blue shirts and caps.

Initially based at Excelsior's Dallow Lane ground, Luton Town began making payments to certain individual players in 1890. The following year, Luton became the first club in southern England to be fully professional. The club was a founder member of the Southern Football League in the 1894–95 season and finished as runners-up in its first two seasons. It then left to help form the United League and came second in that league's inaugural season before joining the Football League (then based mostly in northern and central England) for 1897–98, concurrently moving to a new ground at Dunstable Road. The club continued to enter a team to the United League for two more seasons, and won the title in 1897–98. Poor attendance, high wages and the high travel and accommodation costs that resulted from Luton's distance from the northern heartlands of the Football League crippled the club financially, and made it too expensive to compete in that league. A return to the Southern League was therefore arranged for the 1900–01 season.

Early 20th century (1900–1950)
Eight years after arriving at Dunstable Road, Luton moved again, settling at their current ground, Kenilworth Road, in 1905. Captain and left winger Bob Hawkes became Luton's first international player when he was picked to play for England against Ireland on 16 February 1907. A poor 1911–12 season saw Luton relegated to the Southern League's Second Division; the club won promotion back two years later. After the First World War broke out, Luton took part in The London Combination during 1915–16, and afterwards filled each season with friendly matches. A key player of the period was Ernie Simms, a forward. Simms was invalided back to England after being wounded on the Italian front, but recovered enough to regain his place in the Luton team and scored 40 goals during the 1916–17 season.

The Luton side first played in the white and black colours which it has retained for much of its history during the 1920–21 season, when the club rejoined the Football League; the players had previously worn an assortment of colour combinations, most permanently sky blue shirts with white shorts and navy socks. Such was the quality of Luton's team at this time that despite playing in the third tier, a fixture between Ireland and England at Windsor Park on 22 October 1921 saw three Luton players on the pitch—Louis Bookman and Allan Mathieson for Ireland, and the club's top goalscorer, Simms, for England. However, after Luton finished fourth in the division, the squad was broken up as Simms, Bookman and Mathieson joined South Shields, Port Vale and Exeter City respectively. Luton stayed in the Third Division South until 1936–37, when the team finished top and won promotion to the Second Division, at that time the second tier of English football. During the promotion season, striker Joe Payne scored 55 goals in 39 games; during the previous season he had scored 10 in one match against Bristol Rovers, which remains a Football League record today.

Success under Duncan and relegation (1950–1965)
During the early 1950s, one of Luton's greatest sides emerged under manager Dally Duncan. The team included Gordon Turner, who went on to become Luton's all-time top goalscorer, Bob Morton, who holds the record for the most club appearances, and Syd Owen, an England international. During this period, Luton sides also featured two England international goalkeepers, Ron Baynham and Bernard Streten, as well as Irish internationals Seamus Dunne, Tom Aherne and George Cummins. This team reached the top flight for the first time in 1955–56, after finishing the season in second place behind Birmingham City on goal average. A few years of success followed, including an FA Cup Final appearance against Nottingham Forest in 1958–59; at the end of the season, Owen was voted FWA Footballer of the Year. However, the club was relegated the following season and, by 1964–65, was playing in the fourth tier.

Back to the first tier and late century success (1965–1992)
In yo-yo club fashion, Luton were to return. A team including Bruce Rioch, John Moore and Graham French won the Fourth Division championship in 1967–68 under the leadership of former player Allan Brown; two years later Malcolm Macdonald's goals helped them to another promotion, while comedian Eric Morecambe became a director of the club. Luton Town won promotion back to the First Division in 1973–74, but were relegated the following season by a solitary point. Former Luton player David Pleat was made manager in 1978, and by 1982–83 the team was back in the top flight. The team which Pleat assembled at Kenilworth Road was notable at the time for the number of black players it included; during an era when many English squads were almost entirely white, Luton often fielded a mostly black team. Talented players such as Ricky Hill, Brian Stein and Emeka Nwajiobi made key contributions to the club's success during this period, causing it to accrue "a richer history of black stars than any in the country", in the words of journalist Gavin Willacy.

On the last day of the 1982–83 season, the club's first back in the top tier, it narrowly escaped relegation: playing Manchester City at Maine Road, Luton needed to win to stay up, while City could escape with a draw. A late winner by Yugoslavian substitute Raddy Antić saved the team and prompted Pleat to dance across the pitch performing a "jig of joy", an image that has become iconic. The club achieved its highest ever league position, seventh, under John Moore in 1986–87, and, managed by Ray Harford, won the Football League Cup a year later with a 3–2 win over Arsenal. With ten minutes left on the clock and Arsenal 2–1 ahead, a penalty save from stand-in goalkeeper Andy Dibble sparked a late Luton rally: Danny Wilson equalised, before Brian Stein scored the winner with the last kick of the match. The club reached the League Cup Final once more in 1988–89, but lost 3–1 to Nottingham Forest.

Resurgence and fall to non-League (1992–2009)
The club was relegated from the top division at the end of the 1991–92 season, and sank to the third tier four years later. Luton stayed in the third-tier Second Division until relegation at the end of the 2000–01 season. Under the management of Joe Kinnear, who had arrived halfway through the previous season, the team won promotion from the fourth tier at the first attempt. "Controversial" owner John Gurney unsettled the club in 2003, terminating Kinnear's contract on his arrival in May; Gurney replaced Kinnear with Mike Newell before leaving Luton as the club entered administration. Newell's team finished as champions of the rebranded third-tier Football League One in 2004–05.

While Newell's place was taken first by Kevin Blackwell and later former player Mick Harford, the team was then relegated twice in a row, starting in 2006–07, and spent the latter part of the 2007–08 season in administration, thus incurring a ten-point deduction from that season's total. The club then had a total of 30 points docked from its 2008–09 record by the Football Association and the Football League for financial irregularities dating back several years. These deductions proved to be too large an obstacle to overcome, but Luton came from behind in the final of the Football League Trophy to win the competition for the first time.

Non-League and subsequent promotions (2009–present)
Relegation meant that 2009–10 saw Luton playing in the Conference Premier, a competition in which the club had never before participated. The club unsuccessfully contested the promotion play-offs three times in four seasons during their time as a non-League club, employing five different managers. In the 2012–13 FA Cup fourth round, Luton won their away tie against Premier League club Norwich City 1–0 and, in doing so, became the first non-League team to beat a side from England's top division since 1989. In the 2013–14 season, under the management of John Still, Luton won the Conference Premier title with three games to spare, and thereby secured a return to the Football League from 2014–15. After reaching the League Two play-offs in 2016–17, when they were beaten 6–5 on aggregate by Blackpool in the semi-final, Luton were promoted back to League One the following season as runners-up. Luton achieved a second successive promotion in 2018–19, after they won the League One title, marking the club's return to the Championship after a 12-year absence. Luton reached the Championship play-offs in 2021–22, where they were beaten 2–1 on aggregate by Huddersfield Town in the semi-final.

Club identity

The club's nickname, "the Hatters", reflects Luton's historical connection with the hat making trade, which has been prominent there since the 17th century. The nickname was originally a variant on the now rarely seen straw-plaiters. Supporters of the club are also called Hatters.

The club is associated with two very different colour schemes—white and black (first permanently adopted in 1920), and orange, navy and white (first used in 1973, and worn by the team as of the 2015–16 season). Luton mainly wore a combination of light blue and white before 1920, when white shirts and black shorts were first adopted. These colours were retained for over half a century, with the colour of the socks varying between white and black, until Luton changed to orange, navy and white at the start of the 1973–74 season. Luton began playing in white shirts, shorts and socks in 1979, with the orange and navy motif reduced to trim; navy shorts were adopted in 1984. This palette was retained until the 1999–2000 season, when the team played in orange shirts and blue shorts. From 2000 to 2008, Luton returned to white shirts and black shorts; orange was included as trim until 2007. The white, navy and orange palette favoured in the 1980s was brought back in 2008, following the results of a club poll, but a year later the colours were changed yet again, this time to a predominantly orange strip with white shorts. Navy shorts were readopted in 2011. Luton wore orange shirts, navy shorts and white socks during the 2015–16 season.

Luton Town have traditionally used the town's crest as its own in a manner similar to many other teams. The club's first badge was a white eight-pointed star, which was emblazoned across the team's shirts (then a deep cochineal red) in 1892. Four years later a crest comprising the club's initials intertwined was briefly adopted. The shirts were thereafter plain until 1933, when Luton first adopted a badge depicting a straw boater, which appeared on Luton shirts. The letters "LTFC" were added in 1935, and this basic design remained until 1947. The club then played without a badge until 1970, when the club began to wear the town crest regularly, having first done so in the 1959 FA Cup Final.

In 1973, concurrently with the club's switch to the orange kit, a new badge was introduced featuring the new colours. The new emblem depicted a stylised orange football, bearing the letters "Lt", surrounded by the club's name in navy blue text. In 1987, the club switched back to a derivative of the town emblem, with the shield portion of the heraldic crest becoming the team's badge; the only similarity with the previous design was the inclusion of the club name around the shield in navy blue. The "rainbow" badge, introduced in 1994, featured the town crest below an orange and blue bow which curved around to meet two footballs, positioned on either side of the shield, with the club name underneath. This badge was used until 2005, when a replacement very similar to the 1987 version was adopted, featuring black text rather than blue and a straw boater in place of the outstretched arm depicted in the older design. The club's founding year, 1885, was added in 2008. The badge was altered once more during the 2009–10 pre-season, with the red of the town crest being replaced with orange to better reflect the club colours.

The first sponsor to appear on a Luton Town shirt was Tricentrol, a local motor company based in Dunstable, who sponsored the club from March 1980 to 1982; the deal was worth £50,000. Subsequent sponsors have been Bedford Trucks (1982 to 1990), Vauxhall (1990 to 1991), Universal Salvage Auctions (1991 to 1999), SKF (1999 to 2003), Travel Extras (2003 to 2005), Electrolux (2005 to 2008), Carbrini Sportswear (2008 to 2009), EasyJet and NICEIC (concurrently, 2009 to 2015), and Barnfield College and NICEIC (concurrently, 2015 to 2016). For the 2016–17 and 2017–18 seasons the club's kit was sponsored by NICEIC and SsangYong Motor UK.  The 2018–19 season saw changes to the kits and sponsors, with Indigo Residential taking up the home shirt, Star Platforms sponsoring the away strip, and Northern Gas & Power sponsoring the third. In 2019–20, Ryebridge Construction took up the vacated role of sponsoring the third kit, and for the 2020–21 season, JB Developments will sponsor the home kit, while Star Platforms and Ryebridge Construction continue to sponsor the away and third kits.

The club released the song "Hatters, Hatters", a collaboration between the Luton team and the Bedfordshire-based musical comedy group the Barron Knights, in 1974. Eight years later another song featuring vocals by the Luton players, "We're Luton Town", was released to celebrate the club's promotion to the First Division.

Stadium

Luton Town's first ground was at Dallow Lane, the former ground of Excelsior. The ground was next to the Dunstable to Luton railway line, and players regularly claimed to have trouble seeing the ball because of smoke from the trains. A damaging financial loss during 1896–97 forced Luton to sell the stadium to stay afloat and, as a result, the club moved across the tracks to a stadium between the railway and Dunstable Road. The Dunstable Road ground was opened by Herbrand Russell, 11th Duke of Bedford, who also donated £50 towards the £800 building costs. When the site was sold for housing in 1905, the club was forced to move again at short notice, to its present Kenilworth Road site, in time for the start of the 1905–06 season.

The stadium now has an all-seater capacity of 10,356 and is situated in the Bury Park area of Luton. It was named after the road that runs along one end of it, although the official address of the club is 1 Maple Road. Opposite the eponymous Kenilworth Stand is the Oak Road End, which has evolved from a stand first used exclusively by Luton supporters, then later by away supporters, and now used by both except in times of high ticket demand from away clubs. The Main Stand is flanked by the David Preece Stand, and opposite them stands a row of executive boxes. These boxes replaced the Bobbers Stand in 1986, as the club sought to maximise income.

The original Main Stand burnt down in 1921, and was replaced by the current stand before the 1922–23 season. The ground underwent extensive redevelopment during the 1930s, and the capacity by the start of the Second World War was 30,000. Floodlights were installed before the 1953–54 season, but it was 20 years before any further modernisation was carried out. In 1973 the Bobbers Stand became all-seated, and in 1985 the grass pitch was replaced with an artificial playing surface; it quickly became unpopular and was derided as "the plastic pitch".

A serious incident involving hooliganism before, during and after a match against Millwall in 1985 led to the club's then chairman, Conservative Member of Parliament (MP) David Evans, introducing a scheme effective from the start of 1986–87 supposedly banning all visiting supporters from the ground, and requiring home fans to carry membership cards when attending matches. Conversion to an all-seater ground also began in 1986. Away fans returned for 1990–91, and grass a year later. The David Preece Stand was erected in 1991, and the conversion of the Kenilworth Stand to an all-seater was completed in 2005.

New stadium
The club first expressed an interest in building a new stadium away from Kenilworth Road in 1955, the year it won promotion to the First Division for the first time. Even then the ground was small compared to those of most First and Second Division clubs, and its location made significant redevelopment difficult. The team has since made several attempts to relocate. Leaving Luton for the nearby new town of Milton Keynes was unsuccessfully proposed several times, most notably in the 1980s. The club sold Kenilworth Road to Luton Council in 1989, and has since leased it. A planning application for a new 20,000-seater indoor stadium, the "Kohlerdome" proposed by chairman David Kohler in 1995, was turned down by the Secretary of State in 1998, and Kohler left soon after.

In 2007, the club's then-owners proposed a controversial plan to relocate to a site near Junction 12 of the M1 motorway, near Harlington and Toddington. A planning application was made on the club's behalf by former chairman Cliff Bassett, but the application was withdrawn almost immediately following the club's takeover in 2008. In 2009, the club began an independent feasibility study to determine a viable location to move to. The club did not rule out redeveloping Kenilworth Road and, in October 2012, entered talks to buy the stadium back from Luton Borough Council. By 2015, these plans had been dropped in favour of a move to a new location, with managing director Gary Sweet confirming that the club was in a position to "buy land, secure the best possible professional advice ... and to see the [planning] application process through to the receipt of consent."

In April 2016, the club announced its intention to build and move into a 17,500-capacity stadium on the Power Court site in central Luton. Outline planning permission for this ground, with potential to expand to 23,000 seats, was granted by Luton Borough Council on 16 January 2019. In March 2021, the club announced that it intended to make a number of changes to the initial scheme to reflect changes caused by the Covid-19 pandemic, but that the capacity of the new stadium was still to be 23,000 and had a target opening date of 2024.

Supporters and rivalries

During the 2014–15 season, Luton Town had an average home league attendance of 8,702—the second highest in League Two behind only Portsmouth. In the 2013–14 season, when the club were in the Conference Premier, the club had significantly higher support than the other clubs in its league, with an average home attendance of 7,387; more than twice compared to the second highest of 3,568. Average attendances at Kenilworth Road fell with the installation of seats and the club's reduction in stature, dropping from 13,452 in 1982–83 to their 2014–15 level—a slump of 35% over 32 years. A supporters' trust, Trust in Luton, owns shares in the club and elects a representative to the club's board. The club's official supporters' group, Luton Town Supporters' Club, merged with Trust in Luton in 2014. The club is associated with another supporters' group, the breakaway Loyal Luton Supporters Club. Trust in Luton has, since March 2014, held the legal right to veto any changes to the club's identity, including name, nickname, colours, club crest and mascot.

Luton Town supporters maintain a bitter rivalry with Hertfordshire-based Watford. Watford have remained the higher ranked team at the end of every season since 1997. However, overall Luton still hold the superior record in the fixture between the two clubs; out of 120 competitive matches there have been 53 Luton victories and 38 for Watford, with 29 draws. The 2003 Football Fans Census showed that there was also animosity between Luton Town fans and those of west London club Queens Park Rangers.

The club produces an official match programme for home matches, entitled Our Town. A character known as Happy Harry, a smiling man wearing a straw boater, serves as the team's mascot and appears on the Kenilworth Road pitch before matches. In December 2014, after the seafront statue of Eric Morecambe in his birthplace Morecambe was restored, Luton and Morecambe F.C. jointly announced that the winners of future Luton–Morecambe fixtures would be awarded the "Eric Morecambe Trophy".

Records and statistics

The record for the most appearances for Luton is held by Bob Morton, who turned out for Luton 562 times in all competitions. Morton also holds the record for the most Football League appearances for the club, with 495. Fred Hawkes holds the record for the most league appearances for Luton, having played in 509 league matches. Six players, Gordon Turner, Andy Rennie, Brian Stein, Ernie Simms, Herbert Moody and Steve Howard, have scored more than 100 goals for Luton.

The first player to be capped while playing for Luton was left winger Robert Hawkes, who took to the field for England against Ireland at Goodison Park on 16 February 1907. The most capped player is Mal Donaghy, who earned 58 Northern Ireland caps while at the club. The first player to score in an international match was Joe Payne, who scored twice in his only game for England against Finland on 20 May 1937. Payne also holds the Football League record for the most goals in a game—he hit 10 past Bristol Rovers on 13 April 1936.

The club's largest wins have been a 15–0 victory over Great Yarmouth Town on 21 November 1914 in the FA Cup and a 12–0 win over Bristol Rovers in the Third Division South on 13 April 1936. Luton's heaviest loss was a 9–0 defeat against Small Heath in the Second Division on 12 November 1898.

Luton's highest home attendances are 30,069 against Blackpool in the FA Cup on 4 March 1959 and 27,911 against Wolverhampton Wanderers in the First Division on 5 November 1955.

The highest transfer fee received for a Luton Town player is the fee Leicester City paid for Luton-born full-back James Justin on 28 June 2019. The most expensive player Luton Town have ever bought was Croatian goalkeeper Simon Sluga, who cost €1.5m from HNK Rijeka on 19 July 2019.

The youngest player to make a first-team appearance for Luton Town is Connor Tomlinson at 15 years and 199 days old in the EFL Trophy, replacing Zane Banton as a 92nd-minute substitute in a 2–1 win over Gillingham on 30 August 2016, after the club were given permission for him to play from his headteacher.

Players

Current squad

 

 

The club operates a Development Squad, made up of contracted senior players, youth team scholars and trialists, which plays in the Southern Division of The Central League. The club also fields an under-18 team in the Football League Youth Alliance South East Conference. Luton's youth set-up consists of ten Soccer Centres across Bedfordshire and North Hertfordshire, two Centres of Excellence (one in Luton, one in Dunstable), and an Academy in Baldock that caters for players in the under-9 to under-16 age groups.

Out on loan

Notable former players

Backroom staff

As of 24 October 2021.

Shareholders
 Kailesh Karavadra
 Luton Town Supporters' Trust

Directors
 Chairman: David Wilkinson
 Chief executive officer: Gary Sweet
 Directors: Paul Ballantyne, Stephen Browne, Bob Curson, Mike Herrick, Rob Stringer

Management
 Chief Recruitment Officer: Mick Harford
 Manager: Rob Edwards
 Assistant Managers: Richie Kyle and Paul Trollope
 Head of goalkeeping: Kevin Dearden
 Goalkeeper coach: Kevin Pilkington
 Head of sports science: Jared Roberts-Smith
 Head of performance development: James Redden
 Head of coaching and player development: Adrian Forbes
 Head of scouting operations: Phil Chapple
 Head of recruitment analysis: Jay Socik
 Strength and conditioning coach: Elliott Plant
 Performance analyst: Peter Booker
 Head of medical: Simon Parsell
 Physiotherapist: Chris Phillips
 Therapist and kitman: Darren Cook
 Academy and development manager: Vacant

Managers

As of 9 November 2022. Only managers in charge for a minimum of 50 competitive matches are counted.
Key: M = matches; W = matches won; D = matches drawn; L = matches lost

Honours
Luton Town's major honours are detailed below; non-League achievements are omitted. For a list of all club honours, including those won outside the Football League, see List of Luton Town F.C. records and statistics : Honours and achievements.

Footnotes

A.  The only other club from the south of England in the Football League at the time was Woolwich Arsenal.
B.  Calculated by adding together all the home league attendances for the 2014–15 season to calculate the total attendance (200,157) and then dividing by the number of home league matches (23) to reach an average of 8,702. Attendances taken from BBC report for match that day and Soccerbase statistics.
C.  Calculated by adding together all the home league attendances for the 2013–14 season to calculate the total attendance (169,906) and then dividing by the number of home league matches (23) to reach an average of 7,387. Attendances taken from BBC report for match that day and Soccerbase statistics.
D.  Before the start of the 2004–05 season, Football League re-branding saw the First Division become the Football League Championship. The Second and Third Divisions became Leagues One and Two, respectively.
E.  On its formation for the 1992–93 season, the FA Premier League became the top tier of English football; the First, Second and Third Divisions then became the second, third and fourth tiers, respectively.

References

Bibliography

External links

Luton Today's Luton Town News Page
Luton Town football shirts kit history

 
Football clubs in England
Association football clubs established in 1885
Football clubs in Bedfordshire
Football clubs in Luton
English Football League clubs
EFL Cup winners
EFL Trophy winners
Southern Football League clubs
1885 establishments in England
National League (English football) clubs